Vernon Gholston (born June 5, 1986) is a former American football defensive end. He played college football at Ohio State and was drafted sixth overall by the New York Jets in the 2008 NFL Draft. Gholston was also a member of the Chicago Bears and St. Louis Rams.

Early years
As a senior at Cass Technical High School, Gholston emerged as one of the top prospects in the Midwest after registering 75 tackles, including six sacks, as a linebacker and also earning an All-State selection as an offensive guard.

College career
Gholston attended Ohio State University, redshirting in 2005 after suffering a broken left hand in the season opener. In his freshman season he played defensive end, though recruited as a linebacker. He eventually moved up to the number 2 spot behind Mike Kudla.

In 2006, he earned Second-team All-Big Ten honors from both the league's coaches and the media while starting 13 games. Gholston had 49 tackles and his 18 tackles behind the line of scrimmage, which led the team, included 7.5 quarterback sacks, which ranked second on the team. He also intercepted his first pass in the win over Bowling Green.

On November 3, 2007, Gholston tied two Ohio State team records for quarterback sacks in a game when he dropped Wisconsin quarterback Tyler Donovan four times for a total loss of 32 yards. Two weeks later, he recorded three sacks against the Michigan Wolverines to lead Ohio State to its fourth consecutive win over the Wolverines. During the 2007 season, Gholston recorded 37 tackles (15.5 for a loss) and set a school record with 14 sacks in 13 games, breaking the former record of 13 sacks in a single season set in 1995 by Mike Vrabel. He was named All-America by Pro Football Weekly and was First-team All-Big Ten.

During his tenure at Ohio State, Gholston started 25 games. He finished with 87 tackles (47 solo) and 30.5 stops for a loss. He also had 22.5 sacks, which ranks sixth in school history.

Statistics

Awards and honors
National
 2007 College Football All-America Team (Pro Football Weekly)

Conference
 2007 Big Ten Conference Defensive Lineman of the Year (coaches)
 2007 All-Big Ten Conference First-team (coaches and media)
 2006 All-Big Ten Conference Second-team (coaches and media)

Professional career

2008 NFL Draft
Gholston declared for the 2008 NFL Draft and was projected as a top 10 pick. Gholston was one of two players to record a quarterback sack against two-time consensus All-American and 2008 NFL Draft number one overall selection Jake Long in Long's NCAA career. Gholston was invited to attend the 2008 NFL Draft in New York. He drew comparisons to Kalimba Edwards.

 225 pound bench press

New York Jets
Gholston was drafted by the New York Jets sixth overall in the 2008 NFL Draft. He was expected to play outside linebacker in the Jets' 3–4 defense with the Jets citing his speed, strength and "long limbs," believing they had found the perfect outside pass rusher for their defense. Gholston agreed to terms on a 5-year deal with the Jets on July 24, 2008 reportedly for $32 million, with $21 million guaranteed.

However, Gholston did not play much his rookie season after being expected to start. He saw time mainly on special teams, totalling 13 tackles, 5 solo. In his second year, During the 2009 season, he tallied 17 tackles (12 solo and 2 tackles for loss). Following the 2009 season, Gholston converted from outside linebacker to his more-familiar defensive end position.

Gholston was released by New York on March 2, 2011 after three seasons with the team.

Chicago Bears
Gholston was signed to a contract by the Chicago Bears on July 29, 2011. The Bears waived Gholston on August 29, 2011.

St. Louis Rams
The St. Louis Rams signed Gholston on August 22, 2012. The Rams waived Gholston on August 31, 2012.

NFL statistics

Personal
His younger cousin, William, is a defensive end for the Tampa Bay Buccaneers.

References

External links
 New York Jets profile

1986 births
Living people
American football defensive ends
American football outside linebackers
Chicago Bears players
New York Jets players
Ohio State Buckeyes football players
St. Louis Rams players
Cass Technical High School alumni
Players of American football from Detroit
African-American players of American football
21st-century African-American sportspeople
20th-century African-American people